is a city located in Aichi Prefecture, Japan. The city is sometimes called Owarichinomiya to avoid confusion with other municipalities of the same name, including Ichinomiya (now part of the city of Toyokawa) and Ichinomiya in Chiba Prefecture. , the city had an estimated population of 379,654 in 161,434 households, and a population density of 3,336 persons per km².

Geography
Ichinomiya is situated in western Aichi Prefecture, bordered by Gifu Prefecture to the west. The Kiso River and the Gojō River both flow through the city.

Climate
The city has a climate characterized by hot and humid summers, and relatively mild winters (Köppen climate classification Cfa).  The average annual temperature in Ichinomiya is 15.6 °C. The average annual rainfall is 1833 mm with September as the wettest month. The temperatures are highest on average in August, at around 28.1 °C, and lowest in January, at around 4.2 °C.

Demographics
Per Japanese census data, the population of Ichinomiya has increased steadily over the past 70 years.

Neighboring municipalities
Aichi Prefecture
Kōnan
Iwakura
Inazawa
Kitanagoya
Kiyosu
Gifu Prefecture
Hashima
Kakamigahara
Kasamatsu
Ginan

City scape

History

Origins
"Ichinomiya" literally means "the first shrine" of a province.

Ancient history
In case of Owari Province, this was Masumida Shrine, which dates to the Nara period and was located close to the provincial capital in what is now the city of Inazawa.

Middle Ages
Ichinomiya developed as a monzen-machi from the Heian period and was part of the holdings of Owari Domain under the Edo period Tokugawa Shogunate.

Late modern period

Meiji period
In the early Meiji period, with the establishment of the modern municipalities system on April 1, 1889, the town of Ichinomiya was created within Nakashima District

Ichinomiya was raised to city status on September 1, 1921.

Contemporary history

Modern Ichinomiya
The city annexed the neighboring villages of Haguri and Nishinari in 1940, and with an additional eight surrounding municipalities (the villages of Chiaki, Tanyo, and Kitakata, and the towns of Asai, Yamato, Akiwara, Oku and a portion of Imaise) in 1955.

On April 1, 2002, Ichinomiya was designated as a special city, with increased local autonomy.

On April 1, 2005, the city was further expanded by absorbing the city of Bisai, and the town of Kisogawa (from Haguri District) which made it the fourth largest in Aichi Prefecture, after Nagoya, Toyota, and Toyohashi.

On April 1, 2021, Ichinomiya was designated as a core city, with increased local autonomy.

Government

Mayor-council
Ichinomiya has a mayor-council form of government with a directly elected mayor and a unicameral city legislature of 38 members.

Prefectural Assembly
The city contributes five members to the Aichi Prefectural Assembly.

House of Representatives
In terms of national politics, the city is divided between Aichi District 9 and Aichi District 10 of the lower house of the Diet of Japan.

Public

Police
Aichi Prefectural Police
Ichinomiya police station

Firefighting
Fire department
Ichinomiya fire department

Health care
Hospital
Ichinomiya Municipal Hospital
Kisogawa Municipal Hospital

Post office
Ichinomiya Post office
Bisai Post office

Library
Ichinomiya City Library

External relations

Twin towns – Sister cities

International
Friendship cities
Treviso（Veneto, Italy）
since January 30, 2013

National
Disaster Alliance city
Takaoka（Toyama Prefecture, Chūbu region）
since October 31, 2007
Seki（Gifu Prefecture, Tōhoku region）
since , 2011

Economy

Primary sector of the economy
Traditionally noted for textiles, Ichinomiya is now a regional commercial center with a mixed economy of manufacturing and agriculture.

Agriculture
Dry Daikon
Allium fistulosum
Rice

Animal husbandry
Poultry farming

Secondary sector of the economy

Manufacturing
The Eisaku Noro Company, which produces colorful handcrafting and machine yarns for clothing, is also based here.

Tertiary sector of the economy

Commerce
Kanesue has its headquarters in Ichinomiya. It moved to its current headquarters in July 1976.
Shopping center
APiTA Ichinomiya（TelassWalk Ichinomiya）
Æon mall Kisogawa
Kanesue
Meitetsu Department Store Ichinomiya

Companies headquartered in Ichinomiya
Aichi small-elevator manufacturing corporation
Ichibanya
Kanesue
Konami Amusement
SOTOH
Japan Ecosystem

Education

University
Shubun University

College
Aichi Kiwami College of Nursing
Ichinomiya Kenshin College

Primary and secondary education
Ichinomiya has 42 public elementary schools and 19 public middle schools operated by the city government, and 10 public high schools operated by the Aichi Prefectural Board of Education. The city also has one private middle school and two private high schools. The prefecture also operates two special education schools for the handicapped.

Transportation

Railways

Conventional lines
 Central Japan Railway Company
Tōkaidō Line： –  –  –
 Meitetsu
Nagoya Main Line： –  –  –  –  –  –  – 
Bisai Line： –  –  –  –  –  –  –  –  –

Roads

Expressways
 Meishin Expressway
：- Owari Ichinomiya PA – Ichinomiya IC – Ichinomita JCT –
 Tōkai-Hokuriku Expressway
：Ichinomiya JCT – Ichinomiya-Nishi IC – Hizai IC – Ichinomiya-Kisogawa IC –
 Nagoya Expressway
Route 16 (Nagoya Expressway)

Japan National Route

Riverways

Water taxi
Nishinakano tosen（Kiso River）

Local attractions

Castle
Ichinomiya Castle
Kuroda Castle
Ōno_Castle

Buddhist temple
Houren-ji
Myōkō-ji
Sebe Saihō-ji

Shinto shrines
Azai shrine
Ifuribe shrine
Iwato shrine
Masumida Shrine
Owari Ōmiwa Shrine

Archaeological sites
Mitsui Inariyama kofun
Nekojima Site

Park
138 Tower Park
Asano Park
Azaiyama Park
Umegae Park

Culture

Festivals
Ichinomiya Tanabata Festival（Double Seventh Festival）

Sports

Notable people from Ichinomiya
Ichinomiya Katsumi, owner of the city
Ichinomiya Eisuke, the heir of the city
Ichikawa Fusae, politician
Masaaki Kanda, politician
Shinichi Kondoh, retired baseball player
Tetsuma Esaki, politician
Yukiko Okada, singer
Haruka Tomatsu, voice actress
Rie Kitahara, actress, former idol
Hisa Ōta, stage actress
Kazuo Funaki, actor
Jōji Matsuoka, movie director
Masayuki Toyoshima, shogi player
Tange Sakura, voice actress

References

External links

  

 
Cities in Aichi Prefecture